Tillandsia fuchsii is a species of flowering plant in the genus Tillandsia. This species is native to Mexico.

Cultivars
 Tillandsia 'Millenium'
 Tillandsia 'Tisn't'

References

BSI Cultivar Registry Retrieved 11 October 2009

fuchsii
Flora of Mexico